is a party game by Namco Bandai Games for the Wii and Nintendo 3DS. It is similar to the Mario Party series and Monopoly games for the Wii. In the game's story mode, players must retrieve a stolen cookie recipe from Pac-Man's enemies Blinky, Pinky, Inky, and Clyde by going to a location called Mirage Oasis and return the recipe to its rightful owner, Mr. Cookie. The game was released to coincide with Pac-Man's 30th anniversary.

Gameplay
The game includes a story mode known as "Mr. Cookie's Recipe". It also has a party mode for up to four players. It also has over 50 minigames, which when played, allows players to unlock bonus content. It also has a "Classic Games" mode where players can play three classic Namco arcade games including Pac-Man, Galaga, and Dig Dug, with either the Wii Remote turned sideways or a Classic Controller. The 3DS version of the game allows players to do link-up 4 player with only one cartridge. The Wii version has two extra boards that the 3DS version does not have. A scaled-down version on Windows Phone has 2D graphics and contains 10 mini games. It lacks the "Classic Games" mode that the Wii and 3DS versions have but all three of the games from that mode have had their own separate releases on Windows Phone.

In the game all players start at Mr. Cookie's factory with 1000 cookies. The main object is to collect a number of cookies and get to the cookie factory to win. When a player goes to an empty space or an empty castle, the player can build a castle or claim it. When players go to their own castle they receive cookies (depending on the level). A player landing on an opponent's castle will battle in a minigame (attack and defense). If the attacking player wins, the player takes the opponent's castle. If the defending player wins, the attack player/players lose the number of cookies (depending on the castle's level). If a player lands on a Millionaire Manor, something good may happen. If a player lands on a Tarot Tent, something bad may happen. If a player lands on Dr. Labo's Lab, the player might go to a different space. Should the player pass an exclamation point (!) space enough times, and something major will happen, and then the player will play a boss minigame. The player can then return to the cookie factory to get a cookie bonus along with a castle bonus for each castle gained.

Reception

Pac-Man Party was met with mixed reviews from critics. Many would criticize the minigames for being too repetitive or similar to others, and for the game going on for too long. It holds a 59/100 on review aggregator website Metacritic.

Eurogamer Italy was the most critical of the game, disliking its slow-paced gameplay, "uninspired" soundtrack and repetitive minigames, saying that the board game aspect was "convoluted" in comparison to the Mario Party series. GamesRadar+ criticized its low difficulty level in the single-player campaign and sound effects for being "annoying", while Nintendojo criticized the tilt controls in some of the minigames. Nintendo World Report, Eurogamer Italy, Nintendojo and GamesRadar+ would all criticize some of the minigames for being too similar to each other and for being repetitive after a while, with Eurogamer in particular labeling many of them as "unoriginal". Nintendo World Report also criticized the lack of other Pac-Man series characters such as Ms. Pac-Man, and that the included arcade games should have been those from the Pac-Man franchise instead of other Namco titles.

Despite its criticism, reviewers would praise its minigame selection, presentation and inclusion of Namco arcade games. Nintendo World Report was the most positive towards the game, praising its cartoony art-style, entertaining minigames and easy accessibility for players, saying that it has enough unique ideas to distinguish it from being a Mario Party clone. They also praised the board game aesthetic for its quick pace. Nintendojo commented that it made for a good family game, praising its soundtrack, minigame selection, and for the arcade games being a "great bonus". Eurogamer Italy echoed a similar response, saying that the inclusion of the arcade games was one of the only few positives for the game, alongside its interesting control layouts for some of the minigames. GamesRadar+ applauded the game's presentation and graphical style, which they commented look good for a Wii title.

Notes

References

2010 video games
Digital board games
Multiplayer video games
Nintendo 3DS games
Pac-Man
Party video games
Wii games
Windows Phone games
Video games developed in Japan
Video games set in castles
Video game spin-offs